Entasi (Greek: Ένταση) is the third studio album by Greek singer Kostas Martakis, released in Greece and Cyprus on 5 December 2011 by Universal Music Greece. The album has fifteen songs in total, including an English language song, two duets, three covers, and one remix.

Production
Marios Psimopoulos produced the most tracks on the album with five songs. Dimitris Kontopoulos and Leonidas Tzitzos each produced two songs. Alex Leon, Tony Ray, Alexis Papadimitriou, Nikos Kouros, and Alexander Sandrique Pogrebetsky produced one song each. Two different producer duos came together for the song "Agries Diathesis" (wild moods): Flawless — composed of Vangelis Kostoxenakis and Evan Klimakis, and Beetkraft — composed of Claydee Lupa and Teddy Economou. Vasilis M. produced the remix track of "I Agkalia Mou" (my embrace).

The composers consist of Psimopoulos (six songs), Kontopoulos and Papadimitriou (two songs each), and Flawless, Beetkraft, Dimitris Fakos, Pogrebetsky, Serge Lama, and Ray (one song each).

The lyricists consist of Aris Ektoras and Vicky Gerothodorou (four songs each), Vagia Kalantzi and Eleni Giannatsoulia (two songs each), and Nektarios Trakgkis, Christina Salti, Vaggelis Konstatinidis, and Pogrebetsky (one song each).

Two cover versions of foreign language songs using Greek lyrics appear on the album: "Nai Sta Apla" (yes to the simple things) and "Pethaino" (I die). "Nai Sta Apla" is covered from Romanian DJ Tony Ray's "La Trompeta" — with Ray also producing Martakis' version, while "Pethaino" is a cover of French singer Serge Lama's "Je Suis Malade". "Gela Kardoula Mou" (laugh my sweatheart) is a cover of Dimitra Papiou. Under his collaboration with Pogrebetsky, Martakis recorded the duet "Sex Indigo" with Russian singer Diana Diez.

Release
The release of Entasi marks Martakis' third studio album, following Pio Konta (2009). Released on 5 December 2011 in Greece and Cyprus, it is his second studio album under Universal Music Greece. The digital release of the album was delayed, having been added to digital download stores on a yet-to-be-announced date in December 2011.

Promotion
MAD TV aد Hellas On-Line (HOL) arranged a live performance previewing songs off the album as part of the tenth edition of the "HOL Web Concerts" live streaming series. On the album's release date, Martakis was a guest on Mega Channel's morning show "Proino Mou", where he also performed.

For the winter 2011–2012 season, Martakis appeared weekly at Posidonio Music Hall in Athens alongside Panos Kiamos and Ivi Adamou in support of Entasi.

Track listing

Singles
"Os Ta Hristougenna"   
The album's lead single, "Os Ta Hristougenna" (until Christmas), is a Christmas-themed song. The song was digitally released on 7 December 2010, a year prior to the album's release.

"Agries Diathesis"   
The second single is "Agries Diathesis" (wild moods) and was digitally released on 18 April 2011. A music video directed by Dimitris Skoulos premiered in May 2011. The song charted at number 50 on the 2011 year-end Greek Airplay Chart.

"Sex Indigo"   
The third single is the English language duet "Sex Indigo" with Russian singer Diana Diez. The song premiered on 18 March 2011 in its original form, while a Greek-language version titled "Vres Ton Tropo" (find the way) premiered on 28 April 2011, followed by a Spanish-language version (retaining the original English title) on 4 May 2011. The song was digitally released on 7 July 2011, while a music video filmed in Ukraine by Ukrainian director Alan Badoev premiered in July 2011.

"I Agkalia Mou"   
The fourth single is "I Agkalia Mou" (my embrace), and was digitally released on 14 October 2011. It is the final single leading up to the release of the album. A music video directed by Vaggelis Tsaousopoulos premiered shortly after.

"Entasi"   
The fifth single is the album's title-track, "Entasi"(intensity), and was digitally released on 5 January 2012. It is a dance-pop song written by Dimitris Kontopoulos, Vagia Kalantzi and Agis Ektoras. Martakis guest hosted MAD TV's MadWalk 2012 event, while his performance of "Entasi" served as the opener. The music video was directed by Apollonas Papatheocharis and featured model and television host Vicky Kaya and television host Mairy Synatsaki as guest stars, who were also the headlining hosts of MadWalk 2012.

"S' Eho Anagi, S' Agapo"
The sixth single is "S' Eho Anagi, S' Agapo" (I'm in need of you, I love you), the song was released on 7 July 2012. The music video was directed by Konstantinos Rigos.

Personnel
Kostas Martakis – executive producer
Dimitris Skoulos – photography
U&I – artwork
Vasilis Stratigos – grooming
Konstantinos Gkrozos – stylist
Kostas Kalimeris – mixing
Aris Mpinis – mixing

Release history

References

2011 albums
Greek-language albums
Kostas Martakis albums
Universal Music Greece albums